Patrick Peter (born January 27, 1994) is an Austrian professional ice hockey player for Vienna Capitals of the Austrian Hockey League (EBEL) and the Austrian national team. He participated at the 2015 IIHF World Championship.
On May 9, 2014, Peter was re-signed by the Capitals to a two-year contract extension.

References

External links

1994 births
Living people
Austrian ice hockey defencemen
Ice hockey people from Vienna
Vienna Capitals players